Hazelton is a city in Barber County, Kansas, United States.  As of the 2020 census, the population of the city was 82.

History
Hazelton was founded in 1883. It was named for its founder, Rev. J. Hazelton, a pioneer settler.

The first post office in Hazelton was established in October 1883.

Geography
Hazelton is located at  (37.089862, -98.402261).

Demographics

2010 census
At the 2010 census, there were 93 people, 45 households and 32 families residing in the city. The racial makeup of the city was 90.3% White, 1.1% African American, 1.1% Native American, 3.2% from other races, and 4.3% from two or more races. Hispanic or Latino of any race were 9.7% of the population.

There were 45 households, of which 22.2% had children under the age of 18 living with them, 62.2% were married couples living together, 6.7% had a female householder with no husband present, 2.2% had a male householder with no wife present, and 28.9% were non-families. 28.9% of all households were made up of individuals, and 11.1% had someone living alone who was 65 years of age or older. The average household size was 2.07 and the average family size was 2.47.

The median age was 49.9 years. 16.1% of residents were under the age of 18; 9.7% were between the ages of 18 and 24; 16.2% were from 25 to 44; 35.5% were from 45 to 64; and 22.6% were 65 years of age or older. The gender makeup was 57.0% male and 43.0% female.

2000 census
At the 2000 census, there were 144 people, 55 households and 40 families residing in the city. The racial makeup of the city was 86.81% White, 2.08% African American, 3.47% Native American, 5.56% from other races, and 2.08% from two or more races. Hispanic or Latino of any race were 6.25% of the population.

There were 55 households, of which 29.1% had children under the age of 18 living with them, 67.3% were married couples living together, 1.8% had a female householder with no husband present, and 25.5% were non-families. 23.6% of all households were made up of individuals, and 12.7% had someone living alone who was 65 years of age or older. The average household size was 2.62 and the average family size was 3.12.

28.5% of the population were under the age of 18, 4.9% from 18 to 24, 23.6% from 25 to 44, 24.3% from 45 to 64, and 18.8% who were 65 years of age or older. The median age was 41 years. For every 100 females, there were 114.9 males. For every 100 females age 18 and over, there were 119.1 males.

The median household income was $28,125 and the median family income was $33,750. Males had a median income of $21,667 and females $22,500. The per capita income was $12,745. There were 5.4% of families and 16.5% of the population living below the poverty line, including 32.6% of under eighteens and 15.4% of those over 64.

Education
Hazelton is served by Unified School District 255 South Barber.

Hazelton High School was closed through school unification. The Hazelton High School mascot was Panthers.

References

Further reading

External links
 Hazelton - Directory of Public Officials
 USD 255, local school district
 Hazelton, Barber County, Kansas Barber County, Kansas: History and Genealogy
 Hazelton city map, KDOT

Cities in Kansas
Cities in Barber County, Kansas